Dunia is a 1946 Egyptian film directed by Mohammed Karim. It was entered into the 1946 Cannes Film Festival.

Cast
 Dawlad Abiad
 Faten Hamama
 Raqiya Ibrahim
 Suleiman Naguib (as Soliman Bey Naguib)
 Ahmed Salem

See also
 Faten Hamama filmography

References

External links

1946 films
1940s Arabic-language films
Egyptian black-and-white films
Films directed by Mohammed Karim